Citizen Clem is a 2016 biography of Clement Attlee by John Bew.

Reception 

In 2017, Citizen Clem won the Orwell Prize and Elizabeth Longford Prize.

John Kampfner described the novel as an 'exemplary biography'.

Citizen Clem includes several discussions of Attlee's reading habits.

References 

Clement Attlee
2016 non-fiction books
Quercus (publisher) books